The Royal Danish Defence College (FAK) is an independent authority in the Armed Forces under the Armed Forces Commander's Defense Command, which provides training, research, advice and consultancy services in core military areas. The activities of the Defense Academy primarily target the staff of the Armed Forces, but much of the research is done in collaboration with other research institutions. The head of the Defense Academy typically has the rank of Major General or Rear Admiral.

History
The institution was established on May 3, 1830, when Frederick VI of Denmark created the Royal Military College, which was to conduct the training of officers. Since 1830 the school has enlisted both army and naval officers, just as the Defense Academy has since 1951 trained the officers of the Air Force. In addition, students from the Home Guard, the Armed Forces Health Service and civilians from the Armed Forces are admitted.

Since 1992, the Defense Academy has been housed at Svanemøllens Barracks in Østerbro. Before that, the Defense Academy was located at Østerbrogades Barracks. The Defense Academy, as it appears today, was established on January 1, 2001, as part of the 1999 Defense Agreement. This led to the merging of a number of institutions. In 2014, the three defense officers' schools were also subordinated, so that all officer training in Denmark was then handled by the Defense Academy.

The Defense Academy consists of a staff, the three defense officer schools, the Defense Language School, the three defense sergeant schools, six institutes and a number of independent and subordinate centers:

Army Officers' School
Naval Officer's School
Air Force Officer's School
Defense Language School
Department of Military Operations (IMO)
Department of Strategy (IFS)
Department of Management and Organization (ILO)
Department of Military Technology (IMT)
Department of Military History and War Theory (IMK)
Center for Distance Learning (CFU)
Center for Digital Management (CDF)
Defense Knowledge Center

As of 2020, the institution had over 100 instructors, nearly three quarters of whom were members of the military, the rest being civilians.

Knowledge Center
The Armed Forces previously had four libraries, which at the end of 2009 were integrated into the newly established Armed Forces Library with its headquarters at Kastellet in Copenhagen. For the sake of space, however, part of the four book collections were placed in a magazine. In 2018, the Defense Library was renamed the Defense Knowledge Center based at Svanemøllens Barracks under the Defense Academy.

The four libraries were:

Defense Academy Library
The Royal Garrison Library (Army)
The Air Force Library
Naval Library

Presidents 
1951–1952: Colonel C.V. Hjalf
1952–1957: Colonel Villi Lund Hvalkof
1957–1961: Colonel J. Heidicke
1961–1966: Colonel M.N.M.P. Amtrup
1966–1979: Colonel Mogens Rosenløv
1979–1984: Colonel J. Gerstoft
1984–1986: Colonel P.B. Nielsen
1986–1989: Colonel P.K. Borrits
1989–1992: Colonel J.E. Zilmer
1992–1998: Colonel N.L. Fredenslund
1999–2001: Colonel N.O. Jensen
2001–2007: Major General Karsten Møller
2007–2010: Major General Carsten Svensson
2010–2018: Rear Admiral Nils Christian Wang
2018–present: Rear Admiral Henrik Ryberg

References

Further reading

External links
 Official website

Military of Denmark
1830 establishments in Denmark
Defence
Forsvaret
Educational institutions established in 1830
Military units and formations of Denmark